Kade Hotspurs is a Ghanaian association football club based in Kade, Ghana. They are competing in the GAFCOA.  Their home stadium is Kaladan Sports Stadium.

References

Football clubs in Ghana
Eastern Region (Ghana)